My Dictator is a 2014 South Korean film directed and co-written by Lee Hae-jun, starring Sol Kyung-gu and Park Hae-il.

Plot
After the North-South Korea Joint Statement on July 4, 1972, reunification fervor briefly sweeps over the Korean Peninsula. The Korean Central Intelligence Agency is forced to prepare for what could soon be the first inter-Korean summit and they are worried about South Korean president Park Chung-hee's meeting with the reclusive and potentially dangerous North Korean leader Kim Il-sung. They decide to stage an imaginary summit so that they can prepare Park for a variety of scenarios and outcomes. So the KCIA looks for an unknown (and bad) actor to play the body double for Kim Il-sung.

Kim Sung-geun earns his living doing odd jobs for a theater company, occasionally playing a walk-on part, and waiting for his big break. He gets cast in a small role as The Fool in Shakespeare's King Lear, but he forgets his lines due to stage fright. Sung-geun not only ruins the show, but he feels shamed in front of his son Tae-sik, who was in the audience and had believed his father to be the greatest actor in the world.

Backstage, the devastated Sung-geun is approached by Professor Heo, who praises his performance and tells him to show up at a "special audition." At the audition, Sung-geun is confused when the casting directors all seem to be government scientists, and even when his performance goes terribly, he is told that it's exactly what they were looking for. He and 11 other actors pass the first round, then they're put on a bus and taken to the basement of the KCIA building where they are stripped, dragged into separate rooms and tortured. Too dumb to lie to his interrogators, Sung-geun is the only one left and gets chosen for the job. For Sung-geun, this is the role of a lifetime, and he puts his heart and soul into the performance, determined to have his acting acknowledged and to impress his son.

But when the summit gets cancelled, Sung-geun cannot let go of his Kim Il-sung persona and continues to act like the North Korean leader. Frustrated at his father, the adult Tae-sik places Sung-geun in a nursing home and refuses to visit him for the next 20 years. But when Tae-sik gets in trouble with loan sharks in the 1990s, he is forced to reconnect with his estranged father, whose dilapidated home could solve his problem.

Cast

Main characters
 Sol Kyung-gu as Kim Sung-geun
 Park Hae-il as Tae-sik
 Yoon Je-moon as KCIA section chief Oh
 Lee Byung-joon as Professor Heo
 Ryu Hye-young as Yeo-jung

Additional cast
 Lee Kyu-hyung as Cheol-ju
 Bae Sung-woo as President Baek
 Kim Dae-myung as Stage Actor
 Shin Cheol-jin as Village foreman	
 Heo Joon-seok
 Lee Hyun-geol
 Jung In-gyeom
 Kim Chul-moo
 Chae Soo-bin
 Sung Yu-bin as Tae-sik (Middle school student)
 Kim Young-woong as Mart staff
 Park Ji-hwan as Chief Adviser

Production
According to director Lee Hae-jun, "A few years ago, I came across an old photograph of my father and stared at it for a long time. In the picture, my father looked so young and strong. Is this really my father? He looked like a completely different person from the strict, somber, dictatorial dad I've known my entire life. I was suddenly curious to know what made my father the man he is now. I realized that, for one thing, he lived through a period filled with dictators, both in North and South Korea. The son never gets to see his father as a young man, but a father is only ever an old man to his children. It's a lonely fate, and he must blame and resent others for it. This film is a belated confession to my weak, frail, dictator of a father, and to fathers like him all over the world."

My Dictator was among the 32 films chosen by the Hong Kong Asian Film Financing Forum (HAF) in 2012. The three-month shoot finished on July 8, 2014 in Changsin-dong, Seoul.

Awards and nominations

References

External links 
  
 
 
 

2014 films
2010s Korean-language films
South Korean drama films
Lotte Entertainment films
Films about actors
Films shot in Seoul
2010s South Korean films